The Sunday Times is the weekly edition of The Times of India which is owned by Bennett, Coleman & Co. Limited. It is the largest circulated periodical newspaper and one of the highest circulated weekly newspaper in India. It was the highest circulated weekly newspaper in 2012 and 2013.

Circulation by year 

 2012 - 1,071,963
 2013 - 1,041,047
 2016 - 1,124,568
 2017 - 1,124,568
 2018 - 1,053,164
 2019 - 1,006,056

References

External links 
The Times of India
ePaper
Free Classifieds

The Times of India
Sunday newspapers
Publications with year of establishment missing